Andrea Crosariol (born November 11, 1984) is a former Italian professional basketball player and who last played for Pistoia Basket of the Italian Lega Basket Serie A (LBA).
At , he plays the center position. In the years 2003–2006 he played for the Fairleigh Dickinson University in the NCAA's Northeast Conference.

References

1984 births
Living people
Centers (basketball)
EWE Baskets Oldenburg players
Fairleigh Dickinson Knights men's basketball players
Italian expatriate basketball people in Germany
Italian expatriate basketball people in the United States
Italian men's basketball players
KK Włocławek players
Lega Basket Serie A players
Pallacanestro Cantù players
Pallacanestro Reggiana players
Pallacanestro Treviso players
Pallacanestro Virtus Roma players
Reyer Venezia players
Basketball players from Milan
Victoria Libertas Pallacanestro players
Virtus Bologna players